Barnes Wallis Academy (formerly Gartree Community School) is a coeducational secondary school located in the village of Tattershall in Lincolnshire, England.

Governance
Previously a foundation school administered by Lincolnshire County Council, Gartree Community School converted to academy status on 1 September 2014 and was renamed Barnes Wallis Academy. The school is now sponsored by the David Ross Education Trust. The school continues to coordinate with Lincolnshire County Council for admissions.

Description
Ofsted rates the school as 'Good' and says: Leaders have created a well-designed curriculum, which provides wide-ranging opportunities for pupils to secure their spiritual, moral, social and cultural development. Pupils are well prepared for life in modern Britain.

Academics
The school uses broad and balanced curriculum for year 7 to encourage pupils progress rapidly and develop a love of learning. and gain extensive knowledge. There are a wide range of practical, academic, social and personal skills introduced. Pupils are set by ability in core subjects according to their Key Stage 2 data. Groups are reviewed regularly to ensure the pupils are correctly placed to feel comfortable yet challenged. The curriculum supports all abilities.

Key Stage 3
All pupils study English, Mathematics, Science (Biology, Chemistry and Physics), Geography, History, French, Information Technology, Music, Art
Design and Technology, Food Preparation and Nutrition, PSHCE, Religious Studies, Physical Education.

Key Stage 4
English (Language and Literature), Mathematics and a Science (Combined if nothing more specific is chosen) are compulsory. 4 others The pupil choose from eight GCSE courses, or three BTECs or two NFCEs.

References

External links
 Barnes Wallis Academy official website

Secondary schools in Lincolnshire
Academies in Lincolnshire